Cormocephalus inermipes is a species of centipedes in the family Scolopendridae. It is endemic to Sri Lanka.

References

inermipes
Animals described in 1891
Endemic fauna of Sri Lanka